The Southeastern Louisiana Lions football program is the intercollegiate American football team for Southeastern Louisiana University located in the U.S. state of Louisiana. The team competes in the NCAA Division I Football Championship Subdivision (FCS) and are members of the Southland Conference. Southeastern Louisiana's first football team was fielded in 1930. The team plays its home games at the 7,408 seat Strawberry Stadium in Hammond, Louisiana. The Lions are coached by Frank Scelfo.

History

When the program was restarted again in 2003, after an 18-year hiatus, Hal Mumme, formerly the head coach at the University of Kentucky, was hired as head coach. Mumme became the 12th head coach in program history and he hired Woody Widenhofer as his defensive coordinator. Upon its return, SLU decided to compete at the NCAA Division I-AA level. The team finished with a 5-7 record, the sixth-best record among start-up Division I programs since 1980. Forty-six school and/or national records were broken with freshman quarterback Martin Hankins setting 21 new standards. Before a packed house on a rainy night, Southeastern opened its first season in 18 years rallying to defeat Arkansas-Monticello, 22-17, as Hankins hit Choni Francis on a 22-yard scoring pass with 6:49 remaining in the game. Scoring the first touchdown after 18 years cemented Lions football once again. The team finished its first season 5–7 and posted a 7–4 mark in 2004. The program had a big 51–17 win over #6 McNeese State and entered the Top 25 in the national I-AA rankings. Southeastern Louisiana ranked first among NCAA Division I-AA teams in total offense per game (537.1 yards) and passing offense per game (408 yards) in 2003.

After receiving an invitation from the Southland Conference for the football program to join, the conference where the rest of SLU's sports competed, it began conference play in 2005 - where it remains a current member today.

In 2012, Ron Roberts took over as head coach for the Lions and led them to a 5–6 record. The Lions finished the season with a 5-–2 record in conference play, which was the best conference record the Lions had posted in the Southland since joining in 2005. The following year, the Lions posted an 11–3 overall record. The Lions were led at quarterback by Oregon transfer Bryan Bennett. They finished with a perfect 7–0 record in conference play and earned their first-ever trip to the NCAA Division 1 playoffs. They earned a first-round bye. In the second round, the SLU faced Sam Houston State in a rematch of the regular-season game played between the two in which Southeastern won 34–21. Quarterback Bryan Bennett led a late game-winning drive to give the Lions a 30–29 thrilling victory. The Lions lost to the New Hampshire Wildcats in the quarterfinals 20–17. Bennett was first-team all-Conference in 2013. Placekicker Seth Sebastian and kickoff returner Xavier Roberson won 2013 FCS Awards from College Football Performance Awards for the top positional performances.

After posting a 7-4 regular-season record in 2019 the lions earned the program’s third playoff berth, hosting 10th ranked Villanova in the first round. After trailing 31-14 at halftime, Southeastern came back to upset the wildcats 45-44, led by quarterback Chason Virgil’s 474 yards passing.

Conference affiliations
 Independent (1930–1942)
 Louisiana Intercollegiate Conference (1946–1947)
 Gulf States Conference (1948–1970)
 Mid-South Conference (1971)
 Gulf South Conference (1972–1978)
 Division II Independent (1979)
 Division I-AA Independent (1980–1983, 2003–2004)
 Gulf Star Conference (1984–1985)
 No football team (1986–2002)
 Southland Conference (2005–present)

Championships

Conference championships 
Southeastern Louisiana has won 10 conference championships.

† Co-championship

‡ Includes victory in 1946 Burley Bowl.

Playoff appearances

NCAA Division I-AA/FCS
Southeastern Louisiana has a 4–5 record in three appearances in the I-AA/FCS playoffs since 1978.

Rivalries

Nicholls

Southeastern Louisiana leads the series with Nicholls 17–16 through the 2022 season.

Northwestern State

Southeastern Louisiana leads the series with Northwestern State 38–29 through the 2022 season.

Louisiana

The Cypress Mug is the turned, polished mahogany mug awarded to the winner of the Louisiana–Southeastern football game. Louisiana leads the series 21–17–3 with the last game played in 2022.

Notable former players
Notable alumni include:
 Robert Alford, former NFL cornerback for the Atlanta Falcons
 Harlan Miller, former NFL safety for the Arizona Cardinals
 Billy Andrews, former NFL linebacker for the Cleveland Browns
 Maxie Williams, former NFL offensive lineman for the Miami Dolphins
 Ron Hornsby, former NFL linebacker for the New York Giants
 Calvin Favron, former NFL linebacker for the St. Louis Cardinals
 Jerry Davis, former NFL defensive back for the Chicago Cardinals
 Wilson Alvarez, former NFL placekicker for the Seattle Seahawks
 Horace Belton, former NFL running back for the Kansas City Chiefs
 Donald Dykes, former NFL defensive back for the New York Jets
 Kevin Hughes, former NFL offensive tackle for the Carolina Panthers
 Nathan Stanley, former Arena Football League quarterback for the San Jose SaberCats

Future non-conference opponents 
Announced schedules as of June 25, 2022.

See also
List of NCAA Division I FCS football programs

References

External links
 

 
American football teams established in 1930
1930 establishments in Louisiana